State Line is an unincorporated community  in Bedford County, Pennsylvania, United States. It is located just north of Cumberland and Frostburg, Maryland.

References

Unincorporated communities in Bedford County, Pennsylvania
Unincorporated communities in Pennsylvania